S. Rajammal Samraj was an Indian politician and former Member of the Legislative Assembly. She was elected to the Tamil Nadu legislative assembly as an Anna Dravida Munnetra Kazhagam candidate from Tuticorin constituency in July, 2019.

n.

References 

All India Anna Dravida Munnetra Kazhagam politicians
21st-century Indian women politicians
21st-century Indian politicians
Members of the Tamil Nadu Legislative Assembly
Year of birth missing
Year of death missing
Women members of the Tamil Nadu Legislative Assembly